The National Academy of Sciences, India, established in 1930, is the oldest science academy in India. It is located in Prayagraj, Uttar Pradesh. Prof. Meghnad Saha was the founder president.

Fellows
Suddhasatwa Basu
Sudha Bhattacharya
 Chittoor Mohammed Habeebullah
Vinod Krishan
Neelam Sangwan
Rajender Singh Sangwan

Publications
Proceedings of the National Academy of Sciences, India was a peer-review scientific journal established in 1930. It split in two parts in 1942.
Proceedings of the National Academy of Sciences, India Section A: Physical Sciences
Proceedings of the National Academy of Sciences, India Section B: Biological Sciences
The academy also publishes National Academy Science Letters.

References

External links
 Official website

Research institutes in India
India
Science and technology in Allahabad
Organisations based in Allahabad
1930 establishments in India
Scientific organizations established in 1930